The Fourteenth Day ( / Дан четрнаести) is a 1960 Yugoslav crime film directed by Zdravko Velimirović. It was entered into the 1961 Cannes Film Festival. In July 2021, the film was shown in the Cannes Classics section at the 2021 Cannes Film Festival.

Cast
 Nikola Popović - Timotije Marković
 Karlo Bulić - Žorž Arsenijević
 Slobodan Perović - Pavle Malbaški
 Dušan Janićijević - Tomislav Radin
 Olga Spiridonović - Emilija
 Mira Stupica - Kristina
 Hermina Pipinić - Marija
 Mira Nikolić - Ljiljana (as Mira Nikolić-Babović)
 Viktor Starčić - Žoržov otac
 Rahela Ferari - Sofija
 Branko Tatić - Maksa
 Jovan Gec - Recepcioner
 Ljuba Kovačević
 Zlatko Madunić - Kondukter
 Janez Vrhovec - Službenik SUP-a
 Bekim Fehmiu - Police man

References

External links

1960 films
1960 crime films
1960 directorial debut films
Serbo-Croatian-language films
Serbian black-and-white films
Yugoslav black-and-white films
Films directed by Zdravko Velimirović
Serbian crime films
Yugoslav crime films
Films about the Serbian Mafia
Films set in Yugoslavia